The Drake Performance and Event Center is located at Ohio State University. It was a student activity center named Drake Union. The center is located on the west campus of Ohio State between Morrill Tower and Lincoln Tower off the east banks of the Olentangy River.

Background
With the construction of residence halls on west campus, Ohio State students living there found the walking distance to travel to the Ohio Union long, especially in the winter. The Board of Trustees approved the construction of a second union in 1969. Designed by architect Todd Tibbals, the union was officially named after Edward S. Drake, a former manager at the Ohio Union for 33 years, in 1971 and officially opened in 1972 at a cost of $4.5 million. Following the construction, there were plans to build additional structures surrounding Drake Union, but those plans were cancelled. Although it would appear Drake Union would rival the existing Ohio Union as Ohio State's second union, both unions worked together as community centers for students and visitors.

Current uses
Drake Center houses the Department of Theater at Ohio State.  The center offers Buckeye TV and houses The Ohio State University's on-campus marina. The center once housed Archie's Alley, which included bowling alleys, pool tables, and a bar, but closed in 1999 due to low patronage.

Future plans
The Department of Theater will be moving to a new building being constructed on the corner of West 18th Avenue and College Road. Once the Department has moved to this new building, the Drake Union may be demolished to make room for a new green space and riverfront commons along the Olentangy River.

References

External links

Ohio State University buildings
Student activity centers in the United States
University District (Columbus, Ohio)